Gear is a surname.  Notable people with the name include:

 C. William Gear (born 1935), British-American applied mathematician
 Dale Gear (1872–1951), American baseball-player
 George Gear (born 1947), former Australian politician
 Hosea Gear (born 1984), New Zealand rugby-player
 Jenny Gear (born 1982), Canadian singer
 John H. Gear (1825–1900), United States politician
 Kathleen O'Neal Gear (born 1954), American writer
 Luella Gear (1897-1980), American actress
 Michael Gear (bishop) (born 1934), former Bishop of Doncaster
 Simon Gear (born 1974), English cricketer
 Tom Gear (1949-2018), American politician
 Walter Gear, British astrophysicist
 William Gear (1915–1997), Scottish painter
 W. Michael Gear (born 1955), American writer